Baddomalhi is a town located 35 miles northeast of Lahore, Pakistan in Narowal District. It is located at 31°58'60 North 74°40'0 East with an altitude of 217 metres (715 feet).
The boundary of Baddomalhi post office is extended to cheenay kay dograa village and this is the last village of District Narowal and village is small but violent areas.

Origin
In the reign of Shahjahan, Rai Jani (being converted to Islam, called Muhammad Jani), an ancestor of the Badhomalhi family of Malhi Jatts who actually led the foundation of this city, was granted a Jagir by Shahjahan. The town is named after the Sufi a landlord named Baddo Malhi. The other ancient and prominent figure of that time from rhis village is a Muslim Saint named Syed Faqir Ullah Shah Kazmi. The tomb of Kazmi is also situated in Baddomalhi.

History
Baddomalhi was a well-organized town, before partition. It had good economy before partition; it is because it was the center between 4 very famous cities i.e., Lahore, Sialkot, Gujranwala and Amritsar. Baddomalhi has the exact 40-mile distance from above-mentioned cities.

Economy
Baddomalhi is rich in rice production and most of the population is linked to this one way the other e.g. Harvesting to finish product. The contribution of Baddomalhi to the national consumption and export of rice is above c18%. There are more than thirty-five Rice Mills in the town. A very latest and state of the art rice processing mill with the names of "Al Karim Rice Mills" and " S.J. Rice Mills" has also started working there to facilitate the local rice farmers and dealers. Baddomalhi is surrounded by many small villages and has a good influx of villagers to its markets. Since Baddomalhi is only 35 miles from Lahore, a good number of people commute every day to Lahore for work, shopping and leisure activities.
The area is divided as the lines mated with Sialkot and Sheikhupura.
The weather is rainy and cloudy nowadays.

Education 
Baddomalhi is a very fertile land regarding education though people here are mostly poor and it has very small number of educational institutes.

Educational Institutes 

 City Model High School 
 Government Islamia Degree College
 Government Degree College For Women
 Government Islamia High School
 Government Muslim High School
 Iqra Grammar School http://www.igs.school/
 Allama Iqbal Standard K.G High School
 Dar-e-Arqam High School
 Government Girls High School
 Iqra Academy
 Victorious college

Notable People
Mujaddid Ahmed Ijaz
Naseer Ahmad Malhi

References

External links 
http://wikimapia.org/country/Pakistan/Punjab/Baddomalhi/
http://www.airport-images.com/city_1998737_Baddomalhi
http://www.ecp.gov.pk/content/na/NA-117.pdf
http://www.worldcitydb.com/baddomalhi_-3823989.aspx

Cities and towns in Sialkot District